The 1993 Nippon Professional Baseball season was the 44th season of operation for the league.

Regular season standings

Central League

Pacific League

Japan Series

See also
1993 Major League Baseball season

References

 
1993 in baseball
1993 in Japanese sport